This article contains a full list of cast members that appear on Warsaw Shore.

Current cast
This is a list of the current cast members appearing in the show in order of their first appearance.

Former cast
This is a list of the former cast members who have appeared in the show in order of their last appearance.

Duration of cast

Notes 
Key:  = Cast member is featured in this episode.
Key:  = Cast member arrives in the house.
Key:  = Cast member voluntarily leaves the house.
Key:  = Cast member leaves and returns to the house in the same episode.
Key:  = Cast member returns to the house.
Key:  = Cast member features in this episode, but outside of the house.
Key:  = Cast member does not feature in this episode.
Key:  = Cast member leaves the series.
Key:  = Cast member returns to the series.
Key:  = Cast member is removed from the series.
Key:  = Cast member features in this episode despite not being an official cast member at the time.
Key:  = Cast member returns to the series, but leaves same episode.

Other appearances 
As well as appearing in Warsaw Shore, some of the cast members have appeared on other reality-shows:

Hell's Kitchen
Mariusz "Ryjek" Adam – Series 2 (2014) – Fifteenth
Anna "Mała" Aleksandrzak – Series 5 (2016) – Twelfth (withdrew)
Ex on the Beach Poland
Wojciech Gola – Series 1 (2016)
Jola Mróz – Series 1 (2016), Series 2 (2017)
Filip Ćwiek – Series 2 (2017)
Damian Graf – Series 2 (2017)
Piotr Polak – Series 2 (2017)
Magda Pyznar – Series 2 (2017)
Alan Kwieciński – Series 3 (2017)
Damian Zduńczyk – Series 3 (2017)
Anna Ryśnik – Series 4 (2018)
Bartek Barański – Series 4 (2018)
Anastasiya Yandaltsava – Series 4 (2018)
Ewa Piekut – Series 4 (2018)
Kasjusz "Don Kasjo" Życiński – Series 4 (2018)
Top Model
Aleksandr "Sasha" Muzheiko – Series 6 (2016) – Twelfth
Kasjusz "Don Kasjo" Życiński – Series 6 (2016) – Bootcamp
I'm a Celebrity...Get Me Out of Here! Hungary.
 Gábor Szabó – Series 5 (2017) – Third
Dom-2
Anastasiya Yandaltsava
Love Island. Wyspa miłości(pl)
 Angelika Kramer– Series 4 (2021) – Sixth OUT
 Aleksandr "Sasha" Muzheiko – Series 6 (2022) – Winner
The Challenge

Cast changes 
The official cast members were revealed on 4 October 2013. They are Mariusz Śmietanowski, Anna Ryśnik, Wojciech Gola, Anna "Mała" Aleksandrzak, Paweł "Trybson" Trybała, Ewelina Kubiak, Paweł Cattaneo and Eliza Wesołowska.

On 12 March 2014, MTV announced that Mariusz Śmietanowski had left Warsaw Shore and would not be returning for the second series. Jakub Henke had joined the cast for Series 2. On 20 March 2014, it was confirmed that Eliza Wesołowska and Paweł Trybała would have no further participation in Warsaw Shore. The reason for the participants decision to leave the show is that Eliza is pregnant and she and Trybson are expecting their first child together. They were replaced by Alicja Herodzińska and Alan Kwieciński. In May 2014, it was confirmed that new cast member Malwina Pycka had joined the cast in the middle of the Series 2 and has replaced Alicja. Alicja Herodzińska would have no further participation in Warsaw Shore after five episodes.

In February 2015, it was confirmed that Jakub Henke and Malwina Pycka would not be returning for the third series. They were replaced by Damian "Stifler" Zduńczyk and Magda Pyznar. On 9 June 2015, it was confirmed that former cast members Eliza Wesołowska and Paweł Trybała, who performed from series 1 and one episode of series 2, will be returning for this series. On 14 July 2015, it was confirmed that Paweł Cattaneo had been axed from the show. In addition it was announced that Ewelina Kubiak leaves the show because of Paweł and will not appear in the next series. On 6 September 2015, it was confirmed that new cast member Klaudia Stec had joined the cast in episode 14 of series 3. In October 2015, it was confirmed that Jakub Henke returned to series 4 Warsaw Shore: Summer Camp as a main cast member. On 13 November 2015, it was confirmed that Alan Kwieciński left the show after the fourth series Warsaw Shore: Summer Camp. He was replaced by twin brothers – Pauly and Pietro Kluk. It was also confirmed that Ewelina Kubiak returned to the show as a main cast member.

On 18 April 2016, Anna Ryśnik announced that she had quit Warsaw Shore and series 5 would be her last series. In July 2016 it was announced that Ewelina Kubiak and twins Pauly and Pietro Kluk also left the show and would not appear in the sixth series. On 12 August 2016 it was confirmed that new cast members Aleksandra Smoleń and Piotr Polak joined the cast for the sixth series. On 20 October 2016 it was announced that Klaudia Stec had quit the show mid-series and would be replaced by new cast member Ewelina "Młoda" Bańkowska.

On 14 February 2017, three former cast members Alan Kwieciński, Ewelina Kubiak, and Klaudia Stec made a comeback since Winter Camp. Aleksandra Smoleń did not return after series six. After the seventh series it was announced that Jakub Henke, Alan Kwieciński, Magda Pyznar, Klaudia Stec, and Ewelina "Młoda" Bańkowska would be leaving Warsaw Shore. Anna "Mała" Aleksandrzak had quit the show during episode 10.

On 24 August 2017, it was revealed that the eighth series would feature nine potential new cast members. They were Jola Mróz, who had previously appeared on the first series of Ex on the Beach Poland as a main cast member and second series as an ex-girlfriend of current cast member Piotr, Anna "Andzia" Papierz, Bartek Barański, Ilona Borowska, Jacek Bystry, Kamila Widz, Marcin "Brzydal" Maruszak, Mariusz "Ryjek" Adam and Wiktoria Sypucińska. It was later confirmed that Anna "Mała" Aleksandrzak, who left during the previous series, returned for the eighth series. Jola Mróz, Jacek Bystry, Marcin "Brzydal" Maruszak, and Wiktoria Sypucińska were selected to become permanent. Bartek Barański quit the show and did not return in the ninth series.

Series nine was the final series to include original cast member Wojtek Gola following his decision to quit, as well as Jacek Bystry and Jola Mróz after they were both axed from the show. Wiktoria Sypucińska also left the show. The tenth series included new cast members Filip Ćwiek, who had previously appeared on the second series of Ex on the Beach Poland, Julia Kruzer, and Patryk Spiker. Former cast member Klaudia Stec returned to the show. Paweł "Trybson" Trybała also returned to the show as the boss. Julia Kruzer left in episode ten and was replaced by Klaudia "Czaja" Czajkowska. On 13 January 2019 it was announced that Marcin "Brzydal" Maruszak had quit the show and this is his last season. Filip Ćwiek did not appear in the next series.

Series eleven introduced four new cast members: Anastasiya Yandaltsava, Ewa Piekut, Damian "Dzik" Graf, and Kasjusz "Don Kasjo" Życiński. Damian previously appeared on the second series of Ex on the Beach Poland as a main cast member. Anastasiya, Ewa, and Don Kasjo previously appeared on the fourth series of the show as main cast members. After series 11 Klaudia Stec and Klaudia "Czaja" Czajkowska quit the show. Hungarian celebrity Gábor "Gabo" Szabó joined the team in series 12. There were also brief visits from potential new members: Joanna Bałdys, Paweł Hałabuda, Anna Tokarska, Radosław "Diva" Majchrowski, and Aleksandr "Sasha" Muzheiko. Joanna Bałdys and  Radosław "Diva" Majchrowski were selected to become permanent. This was the final series to include cast member Damian "Stifler" Zduńczyk following his decision to quit. It was also later announced that this would be Anna "Mała" Aleksandrzak's last series. Damian "Dzik" Graf also left in episode 11.

Series thirteen introduced new cast members Milena Łaszek and Marceli Szklanny. Damian "Dzik" Graf returned to the show after his exit the previous season. Anastasiya Yandaltsava, Gábor "Gabo" Szabó, and Marceli Szklanny left the show after series thirteen. Series fourteen introduced new cast members Kinga Gondorowicz, Maciek Szczukiewicz, Daniel "Arnold" Jabłoński, Michał Eliszer, and Paulina Karbowiak. Jakub "Ptyś" Henke returned to the show as the boss. Long time cast member Piotr "Pedro" Polak left the series in episode 5 of season 14. Ewelina Kubiak, Joanna Bałdys, Daniel "Arnold" Jabłoński, Paulina Karbowiak and Michał Eliszer also left after series 14. Series 15 introduced six new cast members: Oliwia Dziatkiewicz, Jeremiasz "Jez" Szmigiel, Lena Majewska, Dominik Raczkowski, Patrycja Morkowska and Kamil Jagielski. Damian "Dzik" Graf left the show while Dominik Raczkowski was removed, both in episode 8 of season 15. Additionally, Piotr Polak, Alan Kwieciński and Michał Eliszer made brief returns. Ewa Piekut, Kinga Gondorowicz and Maciek Szczukiewicz quit after series 15, while Ewelina Kubiak and Daniel "Arnold" Jabłoński returned in series 16. New cast member Michał "Sarna" Sarnowski joined in this series. Piotr Polak, Damian "Dzik" Graf, and Damian "Stifler" Zduńczyk also made a brief return. Kasjusz "Don Kasjo" Życiński quit the show during this series.

For the seventeenth season, Daniel "Arnold" Jabłoński, Patrycja Morkowska, Radosław "Diva" Majchrowski, and original member Ewelina Kubiak did not return after the previous season. It also includes three new cast members, Aleksandra Okrzesik, Przemysław "Sequento" Skulski oraz Wiktoria "Jaszczur" Robert. Radosław "Diva" Majchrowski was with the cast at the beginning of the season despite not being part of the official cast.

References 

Cast members
[[Category:Lists of reality show participants|Warsaw Shore]